= Thomas Amugi =

Ghanaian footballer

Personal information
- Full name: Thomas Amugi Tetteh
- Date of birth: 6 August 1980 (age 46)
- Place of birth: Ghana
- Position: Midfielder

Senior career*
Years	Team	Apps	(Gls)
2001-–2004	Zadar	71	(0)
- * Club domestic league appearances and goals

Thomas Amugi Tetteh (born 6 August 1980) is a Ghanaian former footballer who is last known to have played as a midfielder for Zadar.

== Career ==
In 2001, Amugi signed for Croatian side Zadar, where he feigned injury whenever not being paid on time, before returning to Ghana despite still being a Zadar player.
